Do Not Forget Me Istanbul is a 2011 Greek / Turkish anthology film.

Cast 
 Ali Suliman - Fayiz
 Hiam Abbass
 Belçim Bilgin
 Svetozar Cvetković - Dragan
 Baki Davrak
 Mert Fırat
 Mira Furlan - Ana

References

External links 

Greek drama films
Turkish drama films
Anthology films
2011 drama films
2011 films